Tephritomyia is a genus of tephritid  or fruit flies in the family Tephritidae.

Species
Tephritomyia caliginosa (Hering, 1942)
Tephritomyia despoliata (Hering, 1956)
Tephritomyia grisea (Munro, 1934)
Tephritomyia lauta (Loew, 1869)
Tephritomyia sericea Munro, 1957
Tephritomyia xiphias (Bezzi, 1924)

References

Tephritinae
Tephritidae genera
Diptera of Africa
Diptera of Asia
Diptera of Europe
Taxa named by Friedrich Georg Hendel